The 1918 Drexel Dragons football team represented the Drexel Institute of Technology (renamed Drexel University in 1970) during the 1918 college football season.

Schedule

References

Drexel
Drexel Dragons football seasons
College football winless seasons
Drexel Dragons football